Chia Thye Poh (born 1941) is a Singaporean former politician. A former member of the Barisan Sosialis, he was the Member of Parliament (MP) for the Jurong SMC between 1963 and 1966.

A leftist populist, Chia is most notable for being detained between 1966 and 1989 under the Internal Security Act for allegedly conducting pro-communist activities against the government, with the intention of causing a communist revolution. As a result, he was imprisoned for 23 years without trial and subsequently placed under conditions of house arrest for another nine years—in which he was first confined to the island of Sentosa and then subject to restrictions on his place of abode, employment, travel, and exercise of political rights. All restrictions were eventually lifted in 1998.

Prior to his detention, he was a teacher, physics lecturer, socialist political activist and a Member of Parliament. Subsequent to it, he was a doctoral student and an interpreter.

Early life 
Born in 1941, he read physics at Nanyang University and upon graduating he worked briefly as a secondary school teacher and then as a graduate assistant at his alma mater.

Political activism 

As a member of the Barisan Sosialis he was elected member of the Legislative Assembly for Jurong Constituency in 1963, being nominated as the candidate in replacement of a colleague who had been arrested by the government of Singapore. Concurrent with his holding of office, he worked as a university physics professor.

Ban from Malaysia
He was banned permanently from entering Malaysia in the wake of a political speech he delivered to the Perak division of the Labour Party of Malaysia on 24 April 1966.

Conviction and arrest
In July 1966, he was convicted for publishing a "seditious article" in the Barisan's Chinese-language newspaper. In the same month, he was arrested with 25 others and charged with unlawful assembly for his participation in a demonstration against United States involvement in the Vietnam War that resulted in open confrontation with police. It has been noted that he was active among peace campaigners calling for an end to the US bombing of Indochina during the Vietnam War in the 1960s.

In early October 1966, he and eight other Barisan Sosialis MPs boycotted the Parliament over the decision by the ruling People's Action Party (PAP) to split from Malaysia. This was part of the Barisan's strategy to protest "undemocratic acts" of the Government, by carrying their struggle against the PAP outside of Parliament. He declared that the means of the struggle would be "street demonstrations, protest meetings, strikes".

On 8 October 1966, he led an illegal protest march of 30 supporters to Parliament House and handed a letter to the Clerk of the House demanding a general election be held under eight named conditions, with the release of all political detainees and the revocation of all "undemocratic" laws.

Arrest and imprisonment 
On 29 October 1966, he and 22 other Barisan Sosialis leaders were arrested pursuant to powers afforded by the Internal Security Act. The official statement released by the Government alleged that Barisan's attempt to arouse a mass struggle outside of parliament was prejudicial to the stability of Singapore. The round of arrests was the second one conducted by the government, including those occurring as part of Operation Coldstore in 1963. Chia was specifically detained for his role in organising and leading the street procession on 8 October.

Ties with the Communist Party
The other detainees were released eventually after they each signed a document promising to renounce violence and sever ties with the Communist Party of Malaya (CPM). However, he refused as he felt that signing such a document would imply that he was affiliated with the CPM and, in his own words: "to renounce violence is to imply you advocated violence before. If I had signed that statement I would not have lived in peace." Thus, in time, and without ever being the subject of an indictment or a criminal trial, he became one of the longest-serving political prisoners in the world – with some consequent restrictions upon his civil rights remaining in place for a total of more than 32 years subsequent to his initial arrest. The length of his detention has been compared to that of Nelson Mandela, who was imprisoned for a total period longer than 27 years subsequent to his arrest, trial and convictions for treason, sabotage and other political crimes.

He was deprived of Singapore citizenship in February 1968 as he could not produce a birth certificate to substantiate his claim that he was born in Singapore in 1933. He was served with a Banishment Order in August 1968. He remained detained in the Queenstown Remand Prison "awaiting deportation" (presumably to China) until 1976, when the Banishment Order was dropped and he was served with a fresh detention order under the ISA in June that year.

During his incarceration, he spent substantial time in solitary confinement at the Whitley Road Detention Centre. In late 1978, Amnesty International confirmed that he was detained at the Moon Crescent Detention Centre located within the grounds of Changi Prison.

In 1982, he was moved out of prison and into a series of government halfway houses. In 1985, the government of Singapore asserted that the purpose of his detention related to the allegation that he had been a member of the CPM and suggested that he was therefore willing to participate in anti-Singapore political violence and terrorism.

Release 
{
  "type": "ExternalData",
  "service": "geoshape",
  "ids": "Q870844",
  "title": "Sentosa"
}

Confinement 
On 17 May 1989, he was released from 23 years of imprisonment without charge or trial on the mainland, and instead confined to a one-room guardhouse on Sentosa where he was required to pay the rent on the pretext that he was then a "free" man. He was also required to purchase and prepare his own food. As he had no money, he was offered a job as the assistant curator under the employ of Sentosa Development Corporation.

He refused the offer on the understanding that it was a government civil service position in which he might, as a result, be "muzzled" from talking to the media without official permission. Instead, he negotiated an arrangement where he worked as a freelance translator for the Sentosa Development Corporation. About that time, he remarked about the circumstances of his continuing detention and the culture of politics in Singapore in general, continuing to criticise the PAP of arrogance and elitism, including ruling with "iron-handed policies".

Reduced restrictions 
In 1990, there was some relaxation of the restrictions applying to him. Chia has stated his belief that representations by Chancellor Helmut Kohl of West Germany in the mid-1980s played some part in the Singaporean government's decision to soften its stance in regard to him.

In 1992, he was allowed to return to the mainland and visit the home of his parents, but was still placed under restrictions on travel, activities and associations.

In November 1997, restrictions were further relaxed to an extent that allowed him to accept a fellowship from the Hamburg Foundation of the German government for politically persecuted persons. He subsequently spent a year in Hamburg studying economics, politics, and German language. He was also permitted to change his address and to seek employment without prior permission of the director of Singapore's Internal Security Department.

In August 1998, he underwent a prostate operation in Singapore.

In November 1998, it was reported that the source of his income was the work that he performed as a freelance translator.

On 27 November 1998, all remaining restrictions were nullified. He thus formally regained rights to make public statements, address public meetings, and participate in political activity. He immediately called upon the Government to repeal the Internal Security Act and expressed his interest in becoming involved in political activity.

On 27 November 1998, Amnesty International issued a public statement that restrictions on "Singapore's longest serving prisoner of conscience" had been lifted. Amnesty International considered the announcement to be more than thirty years' overdue.

Since release 
In late 2000, he was pursuing a master's degree in development studies at the Institute of Social Studies in The Hague and expected to complete those studies and return to Singapore in December of that year.

In 2006, the supervision of his PhD thesis through the institute was completed and he has been conferred his doctorate.

A March 2008, version of his staff profile at the ISS describes his position as "Project assistant to the project MPA in Governance, Suriname".

In late 2011, he was awarded the Lim Lian Geok Spirit Award at a public ceremony in Kuala Lumpur.

In 2015, he was nominated for the Nobel Peace Prize.

Writings 
Transplanted or Endogenized? FDI and Industrial Upgrading in Developing Countries. Case study of Indonesia (2006), Shaker Publishing

See also 

House Arrest#Singapore
Internment
Lee Siew-Choh
Lim Chin Siong
Tan Chay Wa's tombstone trial

References

External links
 Singapore's gentle revolutionary
 Security act must go, says victim of 32-year ordeal
   See pp. 2–3.
 Singapore Ministry of Home Affairs press statement of 26 November 1998
 Amnesty International statement of 27 November 1998
  November 1990 face images of Chia Thye Poh
 November 1990 images of Chia Thye Poh in his room
 November 1990 image of Chia Thye Poh waving to tourists
 Interview with Chia Thye Poh, Newsweek

1941 births
Amnesty International prisoners of conscience held by Singapore
Barisan Sosialis politicians
Erasmus University Rotterdam alumni
Academic staff of Erasmus University Rotterdam
Living people
Members of the Dewan Rakyat
Members of the Legislative Assembly of Singapore
Members of the Parliament of Singapore
Nanyang University alumni
Singaporean people of Chinese descent
Singaporean prisoners and detainees
Singaporean socialists
University of Hamburg alumni